Cumberland Head Light is a lighthouse on Lake Champlain's Cumberland Bay in New York state.   

The lighthouse was established in 1838 and the tower was first lit in 1868.  The lighthouse was deactivated in 1934.  The foundation of the lighthouse is concrete and limestone and the lighthouse itself is made out of limestone.  The shape of the tower is conical.  The original lens was a fourth order Fresnel lens installed in 1856.

References

External links

Further reading
 Oleszewski, Wes. Great Lakes Lighthouses, American and Canadian: A Comprehensive Directory/Guide to Great Lakes Lighthouses, (Gwinn, Michigan: Avery Color Studios, Inc., 1998) .
 
 U.S. Coast Guard. Historically Famous Lighthouses (Washington, D.C.: Government Printing Office, 1957).
 Wright, Larry and Wright, Patricia. Great Lakes Lighthouses Encyclopedia Hardback (Erin: Boston Mills Press, 2006) 

Lighthouses completed in 1838
Lighthouses completed in 1868
Lighthouses in New York (state)
Transportation buildings and structures in Clinton County, New York